The 1990 Diet Pepsi Championships was a tennis tournament played on indoor carpet courts at the Wembley Arena in Wembley, London, England. Michael Chang was the defending champion, but he lost the final to Jakob Hlasek, 7–6, 6–3.

Seeds

  Pete Sampras (second round, withdrew)
  Goran Ivanišević (quarterfinals)
  Michael Chang (Runner up)
  Guy Forget (first round)
  Aaron Krickstein (second round)
  Horst Skoff (second round)
  Jakob Hlasek (champion)
  Scott Davis (second round)

Draw

Finals

Top half

Bottom half

References

Singles
Diet Pepsi Championships - Singles